Michael Jonathon Slater (born 21 February 1970) is an Australian former professional cricketer and former television presenter. He played in 74 Test matches and 42 One Day Internationals for the Australia national cricket team.

Early life
Slater was born in Wagga Wagga, New South Wales and lived in both Wagga and Junee for his childhood. His parents, Peter and Carole and two older siblings had emigrated from the north-eastern coast of England in 1966 to Launceston, Tasmania, Australia where his father taught high school agriculture and science. After three years, the family moved and his father became a teacher in agriculture at Wagga Wagga Agricultural College. Slater's mother left the family in 1983, when he was just 12 years old. He later wrote about tough personal times that followed, claiming that his education standards slipped after his mother left the family and that sport became the "only thing [he] could focus on properly". However, it was later revealed that Slater suffers from manic depression. He has claimed that school bullying accentuated his academic difficulties in Years 9 and 10 and claimed that he once ran home after it was suggested that some bullies "were planning to get [him] after school".

Slater wrote: "My family was always involved in sport, so from an early age it just seemed natural for me to play any game that was on offer." When aged 11, Slater was selected in the New South Wales Primary School Sports Association cricket and hockey teams. He also made the state under-12 hockey team in 1981 and went on to be selected in the Under-13, -15 and -17 hockey teams. Slater wrote that, in his early teenage years, he turned towards cricket.

Slater joined an inner-western Sydney Under-16 side over a Christmas holiday to further develop his cricketing career. After topping the batting averages in the Under-17s, in the following season, he was chosen as captain of the New South Wales Under—16 team. The carnival was not a success for him but his team performed "well". Slater claimed that he hurt his Achilles tendon in an accident at school when he was seventeen and played a couple of hockey games following the accident but limped off the field and subsequently had surgery in the lead-up to the Under-17 national cricket carnival. Slater claimed he was informed that, because of his injury, his "dream of playing cricket for Australia was over". However, after an operation, he returned to cricket and was selected in the Under-19 state team for the national championships in Brisbane. He attended the Australian Institute of Sport Australian Cricket Academy in 1989. After an injury to the captain, Slater captained the state under-19 team but he and his team under-performed. The following year, he was vice-captain for the Under-19 carnival in Canberra and scored a century in the opening match. In a victorious final against Victoria, Slater scored another century, becoming one of the leading run-scorers in the series.

Cricket career
A specialist right-handed batsman as well as a very occasional bowler, Slater represented the New South Wales Blues in Australian domestic cricket and played English county cricket with Derbyshire.  His Australian club was the University of NSW Cricket Club, scoring 3873 runs in 77 innings with a high score of 213* in first grade. Slater went on to test cricket, opening the batting with mixed-success, scoring 5,312 runs and 14 centuries at an average of 42. He was generally not successful in One Day International games, averaging a lowly 24.07 and was dropped from one day teams.

Throughout his career, Slater was susceptible to the "nervous nineties": he was dismissed in the nineties 9 out of the 23 times.

Slater played for New South Wales in the 1991/92 Sheffield Shield season. He made quick progress to the Australian Cricket Board side, and was selected for the Ashes tour of England in 1993, when he was 23 years of age, narrowly beating Queenslander Matthew Hayden to the opening berth alongside Mark Taylor, who also grew up in Wagga Wagga. In his debut match, he scored a half-century, before compiling his maiden century in the following test match at Lord's. He continued his good form into the subsequent home series against New Zealand in 1993–94, netting 305 runs at an average of 76.25. In the 1994–95 return Ashes series in Australia, he was the leading run-scorer in the series with 623. The following season saw him notch his first double-century, against Sri Lanka at the WACA in Perth.

Slater's match winning 123 against England at Sydney in the 1998–99 Ashes series comprised 66.84 per cent of his team's entire total. This remains the greatest proportion since Charles Bannerman made 165 not out in the very first test innings of all, which was 67.34 per cent of his team's total.

Slater was dropped from the side in late 1996 after a poor performance. It took him two years to get back into the national team and things went well for a couple of years. He split from his wife and was accused of taking drugs by the Australian Cricket Board (ACB). His Ashes tour to England in 2001 was his last series. Slater's performance slumped and Justin Langer took his place and it has been suggested Slater was bitter and angry toward him. Slater became reclusive. It was later revealed Slater had manic depression bipolar disorder. He could not build a career in limited-overs cricket and his prolonged form slump forced him out of professional cricket after 74 test games.

Arrest and charges 
On 20 October 2021 -  Slater was arrested on charges of domestic violence, stalking and using a carrier service to harass relating to his ex-wife.

On 15 December - 2021 NSW Police arrested Slater after allegedly breaching an apprehended violence order (AVO) He was then released on police bail.

On 27 April 2022 - Slater is under a fresh police investigation over an alleged domestic violence incident, just hours before he had similar charges dismissed on mental health grounds.

On 27 May 2022 - Slater was arrested and charged with assault and stalking/intimidating after police were called to a unit in Manly on April 26, 2022

On 18 July 2022 - Slater was escorted to Manly Police station and charged with breech of bail. Magistrate Megan Greenwood granted Slater bail and again ordered him to abide by the strict conditions of the arrangement

On 31 August 2022 - Slater was charged with two new counts of common assault and one count of attempt to stalk or intimidate intend fear of physical or mental harm after he allegedly assaulted a man at Frenchs Forest on Sydney's northern beaches 

On 22 September 2022 - Slater was arrested for allegedly breaching bail, NSW Police have applied for an interim apprehended violence order to protect the woman he was with at the time of his arrest.

On 9 November 2022 - Slater was convicted of domestic violence charges, using a carriage service to harass, stalking or intimidating and common assault at Manly Local Court, Slater also had two counts of common assault and one for attempting to stalk or intimidate relating to an incident at a northern beaches hospital in July dismissed on mental health grounds. 
The magistrate described the convictions as "warranted" and "expected by the community", saying that repeated domestic violence offending cannot go unpunished. Slater was sentenced to a two-year jail sentence to be served in the community

Media work

Television
After commentating for Channel 4 in the United Kingdom during the 2005 Ashes series, Slater joined Nine's Wide World of Sports cricket commentary team in January 2006. He later appeared as a reporter on Channel Nine's health and lifestyle programme, What's Good For You?. In 2009 to 2010 he was the sports presenter for the Nine Network's Weekend Today alongside co-hosts Cameron Williams and Leila McKinnon. In 2009, he also hosted Australia's Greatest Athlete (alongside Andrew Voss), which aired on Saturday afternoons in January and February. He was co-host of The Footy Show a rugby league-base television program, alongside Paul Vautin, Darryl Brohman, Erin Molan and Beau Ryan and host of The Cricket Show, both on Channel 9. In 2012, Slater called the diving at the 2012 Summer Olympics in London, England for Channel 9 and Fox Sports alongside dual Australian Olympic diver Michael Murphy. In 2018, he joined the Seven Network to commentate its coverage of the Test Cricket and Big Bash League. In 2021, during the COVID-19 pandemic, Slater travelled to India to commentate the Indian Premier League cricket during continued uncontrolled outbreak of the virus in India and became controversial for criticisms of the Australian COVID-19 travel restrictions and claiming the Australian Prime Minister Scott Morrison, had "blood on his hands" over the handling of the COVID-19 pandemic. Slater was axed by the Seven Network which chose to not renew his contract, citing "budget restraints"

Slater appeared as a contestant on the Australian version of Torvill and Dean's Dancing on Ice, becoming the 4th contestant to be eliminated.

Radio
Slater was  a regular contributor to the Triple M Sydney radio sports panel program "Dead Set Legends" and was a replacement co-host of Richard Freedman on Sky Sports Radio's Big Sport Breakfast with Terry Kennedy.

Notes

References

External links

Howstat player overview – Michael Slater
Dead Set Legends – Michael Slater

Australian cricketers
1970 births
Living people
Australia Test cricketers
Australia One Day International cricketers
Cricketers at the 1996 Cricket World Cup
Australian autobiographers
Australian cricket commentators
Australian Institute of Sport cricketers
Derbyshire cricketers
New South Wales cricketers
Australian people of English descent
Australian television personalities
Sportspeople from Wagga Wagga
People with bipolar disorder